St. Erhard (officially typeset St. ERHARD) is a German craft brewery from the region of Bamberg in Bavaria. The beer positions itself as a luxury brand and is predominantly exported to Asia.

Product

St. Erhard beer is brewed according to the Reinheitsgebot (German purity law) of 1516 and has an original gravity of 12.5 degrees Plato with an alcohol content of 5% by volume. The beer can mainly be found in the Indian market.

Branding
The brand positions itself as a premium product. Unlike most other beer brands St. Erhard comes in a clear glass bottle which has a label printed on the glass and a varnished UV protection.

Trademark
The brand name 'St. ERHARD' is an internationally registered trademark for beer and related products and services.

International locations

References

External links
Official St. ERHARD Website

2011 establishments in Germany
Beer in Germany
Beer and breweries in Bavaria
Beer brands of Germany
Breweries in Germany
Beer in Asia
Beer in India